†Pseudohelenoconcha was a genus of air-breathing land snails, shell-less terrestrial pulmonate gastropod mollusks in the subfamily Trachycystinae of the family Charopidae.

Nomenclature
Not available (no type species designated) from Germain, 1931, Comptes-Rendus du Congrès des Sociétés savantes en 1929, Sciences: 166

Species 
Species in the genus Pseudohelenoconcha included:
 Pseudohelenoconcha dianae (L. Pfeiffer, 1856)
 Pseudohelenoconcha laetissima (E. A. Smith, 1892)
 Pseudohelenoconcha persoluta (E. A. Smith, 1892)
 Pseudohelenoconcha spurca (G. B. Sowerby I, 1844)

References
 
 Zilch, A. (1959-1960). Gastropoda. Teil 2. Euthyneura. In: O.H. Schindewolf (ed.), Handbuch der Paläozoologie, 6 (2, 1): 1-200 (17 July 1959); (2, 2): 201-400 (25 November 1959); (2, 3): 401-600 (30 March 1960); (2, 4): 601-834, I-XII (15 August 1960). Berlin (Borntraeger).
 Bank, R. A. (2017). Classification of the Recent terrestrial Gastropoda of the World. Last update: July 16th, 2017.
 Solem, A. (1977). Fam. Charopidae. in: La Faune terrestre de l'île de Sainte-Hélène. Annales du Musee Royal de l'Afrique Central, Sciences zoologiques. 4: 521-533, pls 5-8
 Schileyko, A. A. (2001). Treatise on Recent terrestrial pulmonate molluscs. Part 7. Endodontidae, Thyrophorellidae, Charopidae. Ruthenica. Supplement 2: 881-1034.

External links
 Nomenclator Zoologicus info

Charopidae
Taxonomy articles created by Polbot